The 2011 Clausura Liguilla Final is a two-legged football match-up to determine the 2011 Clausura champion.

After 17 matches on regular season, and 2 two-legged rounds of Liguilla, UNAM and Morelia have reached the final.

Final rules 
Like other match-ups in the knockout round, the teams will play two games, one at each team's home stadium. As the highest seeded team determined at the beginning of the Liguilla, UNAM was to have home-field advantage for the second leg.

However, the tiebreaking criteria used in previous rounds will not be the same in the final. If the teams remained tied after 90 minutes of play during the 2nd leg, extra time will be used, followed by a penalty shootout if necessary.

Final summary

First leg

Second leg

References

Clausura 2011
Club Universidad Nacional matches
Atlético Morelia matches